The Western Hotel opened in 1892.  Located on 7th Avenue in Ouray, Colorado, USA, it was built near the Denver and Rio Grande Railroad's Passenger Station. It is one of the few remaining examples of a wood-frame hotel from the 1880s that remain today. The building was purchased by Zeppelin Development in 2021 and underwent major renovations.

This structure is a contributing property of the Ouray Historic District on the National Register of Historic Places.

References

External links
Ouray County Historical Society

Hotels in Colorado
Buildings and structures in Ouray County, Colorado
Hotels established in 1892
Railway hotels in the United States
Denver and Rio Grande Western Railroad
Hotel buildings completed in 1892
Historic district contributing properties in Colorado
National Register of Historic Places in Ouray County, Colorado
Hotel buildings on the National Register of Historic Places in Colorado